Rodenburg is a Dutch toponymic surname.  Among variant spellings are Rodenburgh, Roodenburch, Roodenburg, and Roodenburgh, each pronounced  in Dutch. The name may indicate an origin in Rodenburgh, the medieval name of the city Aardenburg in Zeeland. Meaning "red castle" or "red fortress", a number of castles and fortresses in the Low Countries carried that name as well. People with this surname include:

Bartholomeus Roodenburch (1866–1939), Dutch backstroke swimmer
Brecht Rodenburg (born 1967), Dutch volleyball player
Carl Rodenburg (1894–1992), German World War II general at the Battle of Stalingrad
Henry Rodenburg (c. 1851 – 1899), German-born American soldier who fought Native Americans
John Rodenburg (born 1960), British physicist
Jordanus Roodenburgh (1886–1972), Dutch urban-architect and director of AFC Ajax
Patsy Rodenburg (born 1953), British voice coach, author, and theatre director
Phuttharaksa Neegree Rodenburg (born 1974), Thai rower
Theodore Rodenburgh (1574–1644), Dutch poet, playwright, diplomat and merchant

See also
Rodenberg (disambiguation)

References

Dutch-language surnames
Toponymic surnames